Brockmire is an American sitcom that premiered on April 5, 2017 on IFC. The show stars Hank Azaria, Amanda Peet, and Tyrel Jackson Williams, with J. K. Simmons guest starring in the third season. Azaria plays a baseball play-by-play announcer based on a character he created for a comedy web series in 2010. IFC renewed the series for a third season and a final fourth season. The series finale aired on May 6, 2020.

Premise
Brockmire follows Jim Brockmire, "a famous Major League Baseball announcer who suffers an embarrassing public meltdown on the air after discovering his wife's serial infidelity. A decade later, he tries to reclaim his career and love life in a small town, calling minor league ball for the Morristown, Pennsylvania Frackers."

In the second season, Brockmire becomes the play-by-play announcer for the AAA New Orleans Crawdaddys.

Cast and characters

Main
Hank Azaria as Jim Brockmire, an alcoholic, drug-using former Kansas City broadcaster fired in 2007 for an on-air tirade against his unfaithful wife (along with a press conference where he tries to set things right but only makes them worse). In the ten years since, he spent most of his time in Asian countries calling non-traditional sporting events, such as cock-fighting.
Amanda Peet as Jules James, the owner of the Morristown Frackers (formerly Savages), which her father originally owned, along with the town's main bar. She is competitive and will do anything to attract fans to the games. (seasons 1, 4; recurring, seasons 2–3)
Tyrel Jackson Williams as Charles, the Frackers head of digital media, responsible for webcasts of the games. Although talented with computers and technology, he has little athletic ability-or interest in sports (including baseball). (seasons 1–2; recurring, seasons 3–4)
J. K. Simmons as Matt "The Bat" Hardesty, a former baseball player turned sports announcer (season 3)
Tawny Newsome as Gabby Taylor, a former NCAA Champion softball player and Brockmire's new broadcasting partner (season 3)
Reina Hardesty as Beth Brockmire, Jim's Filipino-American daughter (season 4)

Recurring characters

Season 1
Paul Rae as Dale, a Morristown resident who acts in stereotypical redneck fashion, frequenting both Frackers home games and the local bar. In season 2, it is revealed that he died in a meth lab fire.
Hemky Madera as Pedro Uribe, a baseball player for the Morristown Frackers, as well as a former Major League all-star.
Molly Ephraim as Bartender
Adan Rocha as Danny Cruz, a baseball player for the Morristown Frackers.
Steve Coulter as Coach Pom Pom, coach for the Morristown Frackers.
Ryan Lee as John Elton, a baseball player for the Morristown Frackers.
Alex Phipps as Ryan Stanton, a baseball player for the Morristown Frackers.
Daisuke Tsuji as Yoshi Takatsu, a baseball player for the Morristown Frackers, formerly a professional in Japan.
Ethan Daniels as Bat Boy Calhoun 
Toby Huss as Johnny the Hat 
Katie Finneran as Lucy Brockmire, Brockmire's sexually adventurous ex-wife (recurring, seasons 1–2, 4).
David Walton as Gary 
Brian F. Durkin as Robbie Butler
Joe Buck as Himself

Season 2
Utkarsh Ambudkar as Raj, Brockmire's broadcasting partner for the Atlanta minor league affiliate New Orleans Crawdaddies, as well as his main competitor for a big-league broadcasting job with the Braves in Atlanta, Georgia.
Becky Ann Baker as Jean Brockmire Glasscock, Brockmire's sister.
Carrie Preston as Elle
Dreama Walker as Whitney, a PR manager
Joe Buck as Himself

Season 3
Richard Kind as Gus Barton, Brockmire's new producer
Martha Plimpton as Shirley, Brockmire's Alcoholics Anonymous sponsor
Tawny Newsome as Gabby Taylor , Brockmire's new co-announcer in the booth
Christine Woods as Maggie, an oncology nurse
J. K. Simmons as Matt "The Bat" Hardesty, a former baseball player on his deathbed who Jim talks to in his final days
Linda Lavin as Lorraine, Brockmire's estranged criminal mother
George Brett as Himself
Bob Costas as Himself

Season 4
Joe Buck as Himself

Episodes

Season 1 (2017)

Season 2 (2018)

Season 3 (2019)

Season 4 (2020)

Production

Background

In 2010, Azaria debuted the character of Jim Brockmire in the third episode of the Funny or Die web-series Gamechangers, entitled "A Legend in the Booth". Brockmire is a baseball play-by-play announcer who is fired after a profanity-filled breakdown while live on air after discovering his wife was having an affair. Azaria based the character's voice and broadcasting style on Bob Murphy and Phil Rizzuto and his sport coats on that of Lindsey Nelson.

Azaria later appeared as Brockmire in 2012 on the NFL Network's The Rich Eisen Podcast to discuss the National Football League. In November 2012, with Azaria fielding offers for a movie based on the character, he sued actor Craig Bierko over the ownership of the Brockmire voice. Bierko claimed that he helped develop the character. Azaria won the case in 2014, as Gary Allen Feess, a United States district judge, ruled that, though both actors had been using a baseball announcer voice before and since meeting at a party in 1990, only Azaria's voice was, as Brockmire, a defined, "tangible" character and thus subject to copyright.

Development
On February 22, 2016, it was announced that IFC had given the production, a comedy series based on the Brockmire character, a series order for a first season consisting of eight episodes. The series was set to be written by Joel Church-Cooper and directed by Tim Kirkby. Executive producers were expected to include Azaria, Church-Cooper, Kirkby, Mike Farah, and Joe Farrell.

On April 5, 2017, right before the series premiere, it was announced that IFC had renewed the show for a second season consisting of eight episodes. On March 29, 2018, it was announced that IFC had renewed the series for a third and fourth season. On December 12, 2019, the fourth and final  season was announced for a spring 2020 premiere.

Casting
Alongside the series order announcement, it was confirmed that Hank Azaria would star in the series as the titular Brockmire. On May 13, 2016, it was announced Amanda Peet had joined the main cast. On June 30, 2016, it was reported that Tyrel Jackson Williams had been cast in a series regular role.

In October 2018, it was announced that Tawny Newsome and Martha Plimpton had been cast in recurring roles for season three and that George Brett, Bob Costas, Richard Kind, Linda Lavin, J. K. Simmons, and Christine Woods would make guest appearances.

Filming
In season one, baseball scenes of the show were filmed at Luther Williams Field in Macon, Georgia. Parts of season one, and the majority of season two, were filmed at Coolray Field in Gwinnett County, Georgia. In season three, filming took place at Regions Field in Birmingham, Alabama.

Reception

Critical response
The first season of Brockmire met a positive response from critics.  Metacritic, which uses a weighted average, assigned the season a score of 79 out of 100 based on 15 reviews, indicating "generally favorable reviews".

Ratings
In its first season, Brockmire was IFC's highest-rated new series and cable's most time-shifted new comedy, averaging over 500,000 live-plus-three-day viewers per episode.

Awards and nominations

References

External links

2010s American sitcoms
2020s American sitcoms
2017 American television series debuts
2020 American television series endings
American sports television series
Baseball television series
English-language television shows
IFC (American TV channel) original programming
Television series by Funny or Die
Television shows set in Pennsylvania